Celbalrai, known as Beta Ophiuchi, is a star in the constellation Ophiuchus.

Celbalrai may also refer to:

 Celbalrai Organic Revolution, Austrian brand of mineral supplements